Charles Joseph Weis Jr. (born April 29, 1993) is an American football coach who is currently the co-offensive coordinator and quarterbacks coach at the University of Mississippi (Ole Miss). He previously served as the offensive coordinator and quarterbacks coach at the University of South Florida from 2020 to 2021.

Coaching career

Early career
Weis worked on his father's coaching staff at Notre Dame as a kid, holding up cards that described the opposing team's offensive personnel on the field. He began coaching at the age of 18, working as an offensive quality control coach at Florida under his father, who was then the offensive coordinator. After his father was named the head coach at the University of Kansas, Weis Jr. joined the staff as an undergraduate team manager. He earned his Bachelor of Science degree in Psychology from Kansas in 2015 during his time there. After a stint as a volunteer training camp intern with the New England Patriots in 2014, Weis Jr. joined the coaching staff at Alabama as an offensive analyst in 2015. After Alabama offensive coordinator Lane Kiffin left to accept the head coaching position at Florida Atlantic, Weis Jr. joined his staff as the tight ends coach. His stint at this position was very brief, as he left to join the Atlanta Falcons coaching staff as an offensive assistant under Steve Sarkisian, Kiffin's brief successor as offensive coordinator at Alabama.

FAU 
Weis was named the offensive coordinator and quarterbacks coach at Florida Atlantic in 2018. 24 years old at the time of his hiring, Weis is believed to be the youngest coordinator in modern D1-A football history.

South Florida 
After Florida Atlantic head coach Lane Kiffin left to accept the head coaching position at Ole Miss, Weis joined Jeff Scott's coaching staff at South Florida as the offensive coordinator and quarterbacks coach. In his initial contract with USF, Weis earned a salary of $350,000/year plus incentives.  In both of his seasons as offensive coordinator, USF posted the third worst offense in the American Athletic Conference.

Ole Miss 
On December 29, 2021, Weis, Jr. was named the new offensive coordinator at the University of Mississippi under Lane Kiffin.

Personal life
Weis is married to Jennifer, a former figure skater.
He is the son of former New England Patriots offensive coordinator and college football coach Charlie Weis.  He has a younger sister Hannah Margaret.

References

External links
 Florida Atlantic profile
 South Florida profile

1993 births
Living people
Alabama Crimson Tide football coaches
Atlanta Falcons coaches
Florida Atlantic Owls football coaches
Florida Gators football coaches
Ole Miss Rebels football coaches
South Florida Bulls football coaches
University of Kansas alumni
Sportspeople from South Bend, Indiana